USS Whiting may refer to more than one United States Navy ship:

 , a submarine cancelled in 1944 prior to construction
 , a seaplane tender in commission from 1944 to 1947 and from 1951 to 1958

Whiting, USS